The following is a list of artists considered to be general purveyors of the psychedelic rock genre.

1960s–early 1970s

0–E

The 13th Floor Elevators
Aguaturbia
Daevid Allen
The Amboy Dukes
Andromeda
Apple Pie Motherhood Band
Syd Barrett
The Beatles
Bee Gees (early work)
Big Brother and the Holding Company
Blue Cheer
Blues Magoos
Curt Boettcher
The Byrds
Robert Calvert
The Charlatans
Robert Charlebois
The Chocolate Watchband
Eric Clapton (with Cream)
Gene Clark
Ray Columbus
Comus
Larry Coryell
Count Five
Country Joe and the Fish
Coven
The Crazy World of Arthur Brown
Cream
The Creation
The Daily Flash
Deep Purple (early work)
The Deviants
The Doors
The Electric Prunes
Roky Erickson

F–M

Fifty Foot Hose
Freedom
Frijid Pink
Frumious Bandersnatch
Jerry Garcia
Gale Garnett (late 1960s work)
The Golden Dawn
Gong
Grateful Dead
The Great Society
Hawkwind
Jimi Hendrix
The Jimi Hendrix Experience
Hunger
International Harvester
Iron Butterfly
It's a Beautiful Day
Tommy James
Jefferson Airplane
Janis Joplin
Paul Kantner
Cem Karaca
Phil Keaggy
Erkin Koray
Arthur Lee
Lothar and the Hand People
Love
Love Sculpture
Mac MacLeod
Barış Manço
Roger McGuinn
Barry Melton
Mighty Baby
Steve Miller (early work)
Steve Miller Band
Moby Grape
Moğollar
Jim Morrison
Os Mutantes
The Mystery Trend

N–Z

Nirvana
Shuggie Otis
Panbers
The Peanut Butter Conspiracy
Pink Fairies
Pink Floyd
Pretty Things
Procol Harum
Quicksilver Messenger Service
Les Rallizes Dénudés
Ramases
Red Krayola
La Revolución de Emiliano Zapata
The Rolling Stones (Their Satanic Majesties Request era)
Santana
The Savage Resurrection
Irmin Schmidt
The Seeds
Shocking Blue
Silver Apples
Darby Slick
Grace Slick
Soft Machine
The Sonic Dawn
Sons of Champlin
Sopwith Camel
Speed, Glue & Shinki
Spirit
Skip Spence
Steamhammer
Sly Stone
Strawberry Alarm Clock
Sugarloaf
Sweetwater
Tangerine Dream (late 1960s work)
Tomorrow (band)
Tractor
Ultimate Spinach
Vanilla Fudge
The West Coast Pop Art Experimental Band
Keith West
Brian Wilson
Robert Wyatt
Ya Ho Wha 13
The Yardbirds
Zakary Thaks
Frank Zappa (early work)

Later years

The Aliens
Allah-Las
The Arcana
The Black Angels
Black Mountain
Black Rebel Motorcycle Club
The Brian Jonestown Massacre
Cloudland Canyon
Cobweb Strange
Dead Meadow
Mac DeMarco
DMBQ
Earthless
Electric Wizard
Endless Boogie
The Features
The Flaming Lips
Foxygen
The Fresh & Onlys
Glim Spanky
Golden Void
The Holydrug Couple
Hopewell
Jess and the Ancient Ones
Kadavar
Kikagaku Moyo
King Gizzard & the Lizard Wizard
Lusk
Meat Puppets
Michio Kurihara
Oneida
Phish
A Place to Bury Strangers
Pond
Tim Presley (aka White Fence)
Psychedelic Porn Crumpets
Psychic TV
Secret Machines
Ty Segall
Serena-Maneesh
The Shamen (early work)
Sticky Fingers
Kelley Stoltz
Sunflower Bean
Swervedriver
Syd Arthur
Tame Impala
Thee Oh Sees
Thin White Rope
Toploader
Tumbleweed
Unknown Mortal Orchestra
Warpaint
White Denim
Wolfmother
Woods
Yeasayer
Zoé

See also

Psychedelic rock
List of acid rock artists
List of psychedelic folk artists
List of psychedelic pop artists
List of neo-psychedelia artists

References

Bibliography

Psychedelic rock